The Dark World, also known as Aşık Veysel'ın Hayatı, is a 1953 Turkish biographical drama film directed by Metin Erksan, and written by Bedri Rahmi Eyuboglu. It stars Âşık Veysel, Ayfer Feray, and Kemal Öz.

Erksan's debut film, it is often described as being "a realistic account of the life of the bard Veysel, shot in his native village". The film was censored because of the showing of the meagre growth of crops in Anatolia.

References

External links
 
 

1950s biographical drama films
Films directed by Metin Erksan
1953 films
1953 drama films
Turkish biographical drama films
Turkish black-and-white films